The Chief Minister's Northern Territory History Book Award is the premier prize for written works pertaining to the history of the Northern Territory of Australia.

Establishment

The award began in 2004. It was created to recognise "the scholarly, literary and creative achievements" of Australian writers and to encourage the documenting of history of the Northern Territory. The inaugural winner was Dr David Bridgman for "Acclimatisation: architecture at the Top End of Australia.  

The award is administered by Northern Territory Library.

Winners and finalists
Source: Northern Territory Library

Notes

See also
 New South Wales Premier's History Awards
 List of history awards
 List of Australian literary awards
 Victorian Community History Awards
 Australian History Awards
 Prime Minister's Prize for Australian History
 Western Australian Premier's Book Awards

External links
 Northern Territory Library

Australia history-related lists
Australian non-fiction book awards
History Awards
History awards
Awards established in 2004